Titovshchina is a rural locality (a village) in Yenangskoye Rural Settlement, Kichmengsko-Gorodetsky District, Vologda Oblast, Russia. The population was 83 as of 2002. There are 3 streets.

Geography 
Titovshchina is located 72 km southeast of Kichmengsky Gorodok (the district's administrative centre) by road. Stepurino is the nearest rural locality.

References 

Rural localities in Kichmengsko-Gorodetsky District